Polygrammodes eleuata, the red-spotted sweetpotato moth or many-spotted moth, is a moth in the family Crambidae. It was described by Johan Christian Fabricius in 1777. It is found in Central and South America (including French Guiana), on the Antilles and in the southern United States, where it has been recorded from Florida.

The wingspan is 22–24 mm.

References

Spilomelinae
Moths described in 1777
Moths of North America
Moths of South America